Fusazane (written: 房実) is a masculine Japanese given name. Notable people with the name include:

 (1513–1572), Japanese samurai
 (1290–1327), Japanese kugyō

Japanese masculine given names